The St. Christopher ameiva (Pholidoscelis erythrocephalus) is a lizard species in the genus Pholidoscelis. It is found on the Caribbean island of Sint Eustatius, and on Saint Kitts and Nevis, where it is more scarce.

Description
Adult males reach a length of  snout-to-vent. Adults of both sexes have a dark olive-green dorsal surface, tinged with reddish brown. Its head is more reddish and its sides more pink. Its underside is blue-gray, with a peach-colored throat and chin separated by a darker region. Its flanks are spotted and marbled, and its back and sides have narrow stripes along its length that fade towards its tail.

Taxonomy
The St. Christopher ameiva was originally described in early 1802 by George Shaw as Lacerta erythrocephala. It was also described in August 1802 by François Marie Daudin as Ameiva erythrocephala, though as Shaw's work was published at least 7 months prior to Daudin's, his name had priority. The type locality is on Saint Christopher island in the West Indies.  In 2016, it was redescribed as Pholidoscelis erythrocephala along with other West Indies ameiva species.

References

Pholidoscelis
Fauna of Sint Eustatius
Fauna of Saint Kitts and Nevis
Reptiles of the Caribbean
Reptiles described in 1802
Taxa named by François Marie Daudin